Casey Cameron O'Neill (born 7 October 1997) is an Australian mixed martial artist (MMA). She currently competes in the Flyweight division in the  Ultimate Fighting Championship (UFC). As of March 7, 2023, she is #12 in the UFC women's flyweight rankings.

Early life
O'Neill was born in Irvine, Scotland and spent the early years of her life living in Kilmarnock. Her father, Cam, was a professional kickboxer and she began training in kickboxing at the age of four. At the age of 10 she moved with her family to Australia's Gold Coast where she attended Coombabah State High School. At the age of 13, O'Neill began training in other martial arts such as Brazilian jiu-jitsu.

Her father eventually relented and allowed O'Neill to compete in her first amateur MMA fight at the age of 15 where she was soundly beaten in the first round by an opponent four years her senior. She competed in another amateur fight the following year and was again defeated early in the first round. O'Neill then committed to honing her skills and spent the next two years training before returning to amateur circuit at 19 years of age. She then strung together five consecutive amateur wins before turning professional at 21 years of age. In 2019, O'Neill relocated to Phuket, Thailand to begin training at the renowned Tiger Muay Thai gym.

Mixed martial arts career

Early career
O'Neill made her professional debut against Amira Hafizović at the Eternal MMA 43 event on 5 April 2019 and was victorious via a unanimous decision. She then secured three more wins domestically against Jada Ketley, Miki Motono, in which she missed weight by 0.2 kg and was forced to vacate her title, and Caitlin McEwen before accepting her first fight overseas with the UAE Warriors promotion. In September 2020 she defeated Christina Stelliou via a second-round knockout at UAE Warriors 13.

Ultimate Fighting Championship
In her UFC debut, O'Neill won with a second-round knockout victory over Shana Dobson at UFC Fight Night: Blaydes vs. Lewis on 20 February 2021.

O'Neill faced Lara Procópio on 19 June 2021 at UFC on ESPN: The Korean Zombie vs. Ige. She won the bout after choking Procópio unconscious in the third round via rear-naked choke.

O'Neill faced Antonina Shevchenko on 2 October 2021 at UFC Fight Night: Santos vs. Walker. She won the fight via technical knockout in round two. This win earned her the Performance of the Night award.

O'Neill faced Roxanne Modafferi on 12 February 2022 at UFC 271. She won the fight via split decision. 19 out of 19 media outlets scored the fight for O'Neill. Judge Robert Alexander, who scored the fight 29-28 for Modafferi, received criticism for his scorecard. Michael Bisping, as part of the live commentary team for the broadcast, said "I don't think [Alexander] should be judging MMA. That judge does not know what he's looking at."

O'Neill was scheduled to face  Jessica Eye on 2 July 2022 at UFC 276.  However, O'Neill withdrew in late April due to torn ACL and was replaced by Maycee Barber.

O'Neill faced Jennifer Maia on 18 March 2023 at UFC 286. She lost the fight via unanimous decision.

Championships and accomplishments

Mixed martial arts
Ultimate Fighting Championship
Performance of the Night (One time) 
2021 Newcomer of the Year
Eternal MMA
EMMA Strawweight Championship (One time)
One successful title defense
MMA Fighting
2021 Rookie of the Year

Mixed martial arts record

|-
|Loss
|align=center|9–1
|Jennifer Maia
|Decision (unanimous)
|UFC 286
|
|align=center|3
|align=center|5:00
|London, England
|
|-
|Win
|align=center|9–0
|Roxanne Modafferi
|Decision (split)
|UFC 271
|
|align=center|3
|align=center|5:00
|Houston, Texas, United States
|
|-
|Win
|align=center| 8–0
|Antonina Shevchenko
|TKO (punches)
|UFC Fight Night: Santos vs. Walker
|
|align=center|2
|align=center|4:47
|Las Vegas, Nevada, United States
|
|-
|Win
|align=center| 7–0
|Lara Procópio
|Technical Submission (rear-naked choke)
|UFC on ESPN: The Korean Zombie vs. Ige
|
|align=center|3
|align=center|2:54
|Las Vegas, Nevada, United States
|
|-
|Win
|align=center| 6–0
|Shana Dobson
|TKO (punches)
|UFC Fight Night: Blaydes vs. Lewis
|
|align=center| 2
|align=center| 3:41
|Las Vegas, Nevada, United States
|
|-
|Win
|align=center| 5–0
|Christina Stelliou
|KO (punches)
|UAE Warriors 13
|
|align=center| 2
|align=center| 2:12
|Abu Dhabi, United Arab Emirates
|
|-
|Win
|align=center| 4–0
|Caitlin McEwen
|Decision (unanimous)
|Eternal MMA 51
|
|align=center| 3
|align=center| 5:00
|Perth, Australia
|
|-
|Win
|align=center| 3–0
|Miki Motono
|Decision (unanimous)
|Eternal MMA 48
|
|align=center| 5
|align=center| 5:00
|Melbourne, Australia
|
|-
|Win
|align=center| 2–0
|Jada Ketley
|Submission (rear-naked choke)
|Eternal MMA 46
|
|align=center| 1
|align=center| 2:32
|Melbourne, Australia
|
|-
|Win
|align=center| 1–0
|Amira Hafizović
|Decision (unanimous)
|Eternal MMA 43
|
|align=center| 5
|align=center| 5:00
|Adelaide, Australia
|

See also
List of current UFC fighters
List of female mixed martial artists

References

External links
 
 

Living people
Australian female kickboxers
Flyweight mixed martial artists
Mixed martial artists utilizing kickboxing
Mixed martial artists utilizing Brazilian jiu-jitsu
Ultimate Fighting Championship female fighters
Australian female mixed martial artists
Mixed martial artists from the Gold Coast
Australian practitioners of Brazilian jiu-jitsu
Female Brazilian jiu-jitsu practitioners
Sportswomen from Queensland
Scottish emigrants to Australia
Sportspeople from Kilmarnock
1997 births